Petractis is a genus of lichenized fungi of uncertain familial and ordinal placement in the Lecanoromycetes. The genus was circumscription by mycologist Elias Magnus Fries in 1846.

References

Lecanoromycetes
Lichen genera
Lecanoromycetes genera
Taxa named by Elias Magnus Fries
Taxa described in 1845